Rocchetti is an Italian surname. Notable people with the surname include:

 Antonino Rocchetti Torres (1851–1934), Italian painter
 Elisabetta Rocchetti (born 1975), Italian actress and director
 Federico Rocchetti (born 1986), Italian racing cyclist
 Manlio Rocchetti (1943–2017), Italian makeup artist
 Santino Rocchetti (born 1946), Italian singer-songwriter and musician

Italian-language surnames